Bakhtiyar Duyshobekov (born 3 June 1995) is a Kyrgyz professional footballer who plays as a defensive midfielder for Kyrgyz Premier League side Alay Osh and the Kyrgyzstan national team.

Club career

Dordoi Bishkek
In December 2017, Duyshobekov signed for Kyrgyzstan League team FC Dordoi Bishkek. Dordoi Bishkek announced that they had mutual agreed to end Duyshobekov's contract on 4 June 2018.

Kelantan
Duyshobekov joined Malaysia Super League team Kelantan in June 2018. He played 9 matches in 2018 Malaysia Super League. He left the team at the end of the season when his contract expired.

Bashundhara Kings
Duyshobekov joined Bangladesh Premier League team Bashundhara Kings in later 2018 to play Bangladesh Premier League. He recorded 7 goals and 10 assists in 23 matches in the league helping Bashundhara Kings to lift the Premier League trophy for the first time ever.

Sheikh Russel KC
On 12 December 2020, Duyshobekov joined Sheikh Russel KC in Bangladesh Football Premier League.

Career statistics

Club

International

International goals
Score and Result lists Kyrgyzstan goals first

References

External links
 
 

1995 births
Living people
Kyrgyzstani footballers
Association football midfielders
Kyrgyzstan international footballers
2019 AFC Asian Cup players
Kyrgyzstani expatriate footballers
Expatriate footballers in Belarus
Kyrgyzstani expatriate sportspeople in Belarus
Expatriate footballers in Turkey
Kyrgyzstani expatriate sportspeople in Turkey
Expatriate footballers in Malaysia
Kyrgyzstani expatriate sportspeople in Malaysia
Expatriate footballers in Bangladesh
Kyrgyzstani expatriate sportspeople in Bangladesh
FC Dinamo Bishkek players
FC Abdysh-Ata Kant players
FC Krumkachy Minsk players
FC Dordoi Bishkek players
Kelantan FA players
Bashundhara Kings players
Sheikh Russel KC players